Cladolasma damingshan, is a species of harvestman belonging to the family Nemastomatidae. It is found in Southern China.

Species is characterized by the absence of keels around the eyes and arrangement of large spines on the penial glans in males.

References

Animals described in 2013
Harvestmen